Ronny Carlos da Silva Letieres (born 25 February 1983), known as just Ronny, is a Brazilian footballer.

Influenced in his youth by his father, a fanatic supporter of Bahia, Ronny followed the campaign that led to the club's second national title in 1989. He was an admirer of strikers Bobô and Charles, along with midfielders Paulo Rodrigues and Carlos. In spite of Bobô being the great idol of the fans, Ronny identified most strongly with Charles because of his many goals.

When Ronny was 15 the family moved to the state of Rio Grande do Norte when his father received a promotion. There, Ronny auditioned for various clubs such as Baraúnas and ABC (RN), and was accepted for the ABC squad, where he played in their youth system until he was 19. At 20 he was promoted to the first team and began training with the professionals after impressing in the Premier League U-20 and BH Cup tournaments, being top scorer in both competitions. After a good showing in the Brazilian Championship Series B in 2003, especially in the match between ABC (RN) and Clube de Regatas Brasil, he was transferred to Criciúma Esporte Clube. He soon got the opportunity to play for FC Zürich in Switzerland, where he had a great season, with 23 goals in 33 games. He was next transferred to F.C. Paços de Ferreira of Portugal. Constantly subject to various injuries, he played only 10 matches and scored just 3 goals.

Honours
CFR Cluj
Liga I: 2011–12

References

External links

Brazilian footballers
Brazilian expatriate footballers
Ronny Carlos da Silva
Expatriate footballers in Portugal
Expatriate footballers in Switzerland
Expatriate footballers in China
Expatriate footballers in Romania
Ronny Carlos da Silva
Chinese Super League players
China League One players
Swiss Super League players
Liga I players
FC Zürich players
F.C. Paços de Ferreira players
Ronny Carlos da Silva
Guangdong Sunray Cave players
Shanghai Shenhua F.C. players
Beijing Renhe F.C. players
CFR Cluj players
Brazilian expatriate sportspeople in China
Brazilian expatriate sportspeople in Romania
1983 births
Association football forwards